Rachel Wood  is a palaeobiologist, geologist and Professor of Carbonate Geoscience at the University of Edinburgh School of GeoSciences.

Her research covers the Ediacaran–Cambrian transition, the origin of biomineralisation, the evolution of reef systems, and carbonate production through time.

She is the author of Reef Evolution published by Oxford University Press (1999).

She is an associate editor of the journal Science Advances. In 2020, she was awarded the Lyell Medal of Geological Society of London, while in 2022 she was elected a Fellow of the Royal Society.

References

British geologists
Fellows of the Royal Society
Academics of the University of Edinburgh
Alumni of the University of Bristol
Living people
British palaeontologists
Year of birth missing (living people)
Lyell Medal winners